The Woodford Baronetcy, of Carleby in the County of Lincoln, was a title in the Baronetage of Great Britain. It was created on 28 July 1791 for Ralph Woodford, the former Ambassador to Denmark. The second Baronet was Governor of Trinidad between 1813 and 1828. The title became extinct on his death the latter year.

Woodford baronets, of Carleby (1791)

Sir Ralph Woodford, 1st Baronet (–1810)
Sir Ralph James Woodford, 2nd Baronet (c. 1784–1828)

References

Extinct baronetcies in the Baronetage of Great Britain